Calyciphora albodactylus is a moth of the family Pterophoridae. It is found in most of Europe, except Portugal, the Benelux, Great Britain and Ireland. It is also known from Russia and Anatolia. The species was first described by Johan Christian Fabricius in 1794.

The wingspan is 20–28 mm.

The larvae feed on Arctium lappa, Carlina acanthifolia, Carlina biebersteinii, Carlina vulgaris, Cirsium ferox, Cirsium helenioides, Echinops armatus, Echinops ritro, Echinops sphaerocephalus, Jurinea cyanoides and Serratula.

References

Pterophorini
Moths described in 1794
Moths of Asia
Plume moths of Europe
Taxa named by Johan Christian Fabricius